Standeniella is a small genus of very small sea snails, pyramidellid gastropod mollusks or micromollusks. This genus is currently placed in the subfamily Chrysallidinae of the family Odostomiidae.

Shell description
The original description by Laseron (1958) (in French) states that there are ribs at the summit basal of the whorls. They are placed medially on the whorls and sometimes lacking.

Life history
Nothing is known about the biology of the members of this genus. As is true of most members of the Pyramidellidae sensu lato, they are most likely to be ectoparasites.

Species
Species within the genus Standeniella include:
 Standeniella standeni (Dautzenberg & Fischer, 1906) (Type species) (as Pyrgulina standeni)
 Standeniella difficilis Saurin, 1958

References
 

Pyramidellidae

de:Pyramidelloidea